
Hannibal Mago was a grandson of Hamilcar Mago. He predates the more famous Carthaginian general Hannibal by about 200 years.

Career
He was shofet (judge) of Carthage in 410 BC and in 409 BC commanded a Carthaginian army sent to Sicily in response to a request from the city of Segesta. In the Battle of Selinus he successfully took the Greek city of Selinus and then Himera. In the process of this conquest he was said to have killed some 3,000 prisoners of war, reportedly as revenge for the defeat his grandfather suffered in the Battle of Himera 70 years before.

Death
In 406 BC Hannibal Mago died in a plague that broke out during the siege of Agrigento.

See also
 Agrigentum inscription
 Other Hannibals in Carthaginian history
 Magonids

References

Citations

Bibliography
 .  
Xenophon, Hellenika

406 BC deaths
Magonids
Year of birth unknown
Monarchs of Carthage
Deaths from infectious disease
5th-century BC rulers
People of the Sicilian Wars
5th-century BC Punic people